St. Luke's may refer to:

Places
St Luke's, London, a district of London, UK
St Luke's, Old Street, church of the above parish
St Luke's Campus, part of the University of Exeter, Exeter, Devon, England
St Luke's railway station, Southport, Merseyside, UK

Others
St. Luke's University Health Network, a hospital/health network in Bethlehem, Pennsylvania, USA
Saint Luke's Health System, a health care system and affiliated hospitals around Kansas City, Missouri, USA
Saint Luke's Home for Destitute and Aged Women, in Middletown, Connecticut, USA

See also
Westfield St Lukes, a shopping mall in Auckland, New Zealand
St. Luke's Church (disambiguation)
St Luke's Hospital (disambiguation)
St. Luke's School (disambiguation)
St Luke's University (disambiguation)
Saint Luke (disambiguation)
Saint-Luc (disambiguation)